CSU Ballpark is a baseball venue located in North Charleston, South Carolina, United States.  It is home to the Charleston Southern Buccaneers college baseball team of the Division I Big South Conference.  It has a capacity of 1,500 spectators.

Recent renovations of the facility have improved the backstop, dugouts, and fencing.  Also, new bleacher seating has increased capacity, and limited chairback seating has been added for season ticket holders.  During the 2013 season, stadium lighting was installed at the facility.  The project was estimated to cost $350,000, with the city of North Charleston making a sizeable contribution in return for access to the facility for events.  The first night game at the facility was scheduled for April 19, 2013, against Big South rival Presbyterian.  The Buccaneers hope to draw bigger name programs to play at the field in future years.

See also
 List of NCAA Division I baseball venues

References

College baseball venues in the United States
Baseball venues in South Carolina
Sports venues in Charleston County, South Carolina
Charleston Southern Buccaneers baseball